Thomas Butler King I (August 27, 1800 – May 10, 1864) was an American politician from the state of Georgia. Late in life, King spent ten years in the newly admitted state of California and twice attempted to become a senator from that state.

Early life 
He was born on August 27, 1800, in Palmer, Massachusetts, to Daniel King and Hannah Lord. He was of English descent, and among his first ancestors coming to America was John King, of Edwardstone, Suffolk, England, who, in 1715, was the first settler on a tract of land in what was then the Colony of Massachusetts. For a generation or more, that tract of land was known as Kingstown. Afterwards, it was called Palmer.

He attended Westfield State University and then studied law under his brother, Henry King in Allentown, Pennsylvania. He was admitted to the Pennsylvania State Bar in 1822.

Georgia 
In 1823 he traveled with his brother, Stephen Clay King, to practice law in Waynesville, Georgia.

In 1824, he married Anna Matilda Page (c. 1800 – 1859). They had ten children who survived to adulthood, including a son, John Floyd King. Thomas was elected to the Georgia Senate in 1832 to represent Glynn County, Georgia, and served in that position in 1834, 1835, and again in 1837. He was elected to the US House of Representatives in 1838 to the 26th Congress.

King would attempt to regain his old seat in the Confederate Congress in 1863 against Julian Hartridge. King narrowly lost, receiving 2,909 votes to Hartridge's 3,077 votes and a third candidate named C.H. Hopkins' 766. This likely occurred because of distrust of King by Savannah voters.

California 
King accepted an appointment in California as tax collector for the Port of San Francisco under President Millard Fillmore. King then went to work as a lobbyist for the Southern Pacific Railroad Company. He also attempted to become senator from California.

San Francisco's King Street, near the port and major rail yards, is named after him.

Death 
King died in Waresboro, Georgia on May 10, 1864. He was buried in the churchyard of Christ Church on St. Simons Island.

See also 
United States House election, 1838
 Brunswick–Altamaha Canal
 Neptune Small

References

Sources 
 Edward M. Steel, Jr. T. Butler King of Georgia (University of Georgia Press: 1964)

External links 
 Stuart A. Rose Manuscript, Archives, and Rare Book Library, Emory University: T. Butler King papers,1845-1851

1800 births
1864 deaths
Georgia (U.S. state) state senators
Georgia (U.S. state) lawyers
People from Palmer, Massachusetts
California Whigs
People from Glynn County, Georgia
Whig Party members of the United States House of Representatives from Georgia (U.S. state)
People from Brantley County, Georgia
American slave owners
19th-century American politicians
19th-century American lawyers